Rutledal is a village in Gulen Municipality in Vestland county, Norway. The village is located at the mouth of the Sognefjorden, on the south side on the mainland. Rutledal has a ferry quay that has regular connections to the island municipality of Solund to the northwest and to Hyllestad Municipality on the mainland across the fjord to the north.

Rutledal is a rural village sitting at the northern end of a narrow, forested valley. The Rutledal area has a number of farms that have been cleared of trees, although not all are currently in use. For a time, Rutledal had a small store and a post office.

References 

Villages in Vestland
Gulen